Evening brown may refer to:

Melanitis, a genus of tropical and subtropical satyr butterflies
Melanitis leda, a species in that genus native to Africa, India, Indochina, Oceania, and the Pacific Islands